Hyacinth  or Hyacinthus (Ancient Greek: ,) is a gentle and clever divine hero and a lover of Apollo from Greek mythology. His cult at Amyclae southwest of Sparta dates from the Mycenaean era. A temenos or sanctuary grew up around what was alleged to be his burial mound, which was located in the Classical period at the feet of Apollo's statue. The literary myths serve to link him to local cults, and to identify him with Apollo.

Family 
Hyacinth was given various parentage, providing local links, as the son of Clio and Pierus, or King Oebalus of Sparta, or of king Amyclus of Sparta, progenitor of the people of Amyclae, dwellers about Sparta. As the youngest and most beautiful son of Amyclas and Diomede, daughter of Lapithes, Hyacinth was the brother of Cynortus, Argalus, Polyboea, Laodamia (or Leanira), Harpalus, Hegesandra, and in other versions, of Daphne. If he was the son of Clio and Pierus, Hyacinthus's brother was Rhagus.

Mythology
In Greek mythology, Hyacinthus was a Spartan prince of remarkable beauty and a lover of the sun god Apollo. He was also admired by Zephyrus, the god of the West wind, Boreas, the god of the North wind and a mortal man named Thamyris. Hyacinthus chose Apollo over the others. He visited all of Apollo's sacred lands with the god in a chariot drawn by swans. So fiercely was Apollo in love with Hyacinthus that he abandoned his sanctuary in Delphi to enjoy Hyacinthus' company by the river Eurotas. He taught Hyacinthus the use of the bow and the lyre, the art of prophecy, and exercises in the gymnasium.

One day, Apollo was teaching him the game of quoits. They decided to have a friendly competition by taking turns to throw the discus. Apollo threw first, with a strength so great that the discus split the clouds in the sky. Eager to retrieve the discus, Hyacinthus ran behind it to catch it. But as it hit the ground, the discus bounced back, hitting Hyacinthus' head and wounding him fatally. An alternative version of the myth holds Zephyrus responsible for the death of Hyacinthus. Jealous that Hyacinthus preferred the radiant Apollo, Zephyrus blew Apollo's quoit boisterously off course to kill Hyacinthus.

Apollo's face turned pale as he held his dying lover in his arms. He used all sorts of herbs and even tried giving ambrosia to heal Hyacinthus' wound, but it was futile, for he could not cure the wound inflicted by the Fates. Apollo wept for Hyacinthus' death and expressed his wish to become a mortal to join the Spartan boy in his death. That being unachievable because of his immortality, Apollo promised that he would always remind himself of Hyacinthus through his songs and the music of his lyre. He created a flower from Hyacinth's spilled blood, the hyacinth, and inscribed on its petals the words of lamentation, "AI AI" – "alas". However, based on its ancient description, the flower Hyacinth turned into is not the modern plant bearing that name.

The Bibliotheca said Thamyris, who showed romantic feelings towards Hyacinthus, was the first man to have loved another man.

Apotheosis and Hyacinthia

Hyacinthus was eventually resurrected by Apollo and attained immortality. Pausanias has recorded that the throne of Apollo in Sparta had the depiction of bearded Hyacinthus being taken to heaven along with Polyboea by Aphrodite, Athena and Artemis.

Hyacinthus was the tutelary deity of one of the principal Spartan festivals, Hyacinthia, celebrated in the Spartan month of Hyacinthia (in early summer). The festival lasted three days, one day of mourning for the death of Hyacinth, and the last two celebrating his rebirth, though the division of honours is a subject for scholarly controversy. On the first day, people mourned his death by eating as little as possible and abstaining from singing songs, contrary to all the other festivals of Apollo. On the second day, choirs of boys and young men sang some of their national songs and danced. As for the girls, some were carried in decorated wicker carts and others paraded in chariots pulled by two horses, which they raced. Citizens entertained their friends and even their own servants. Every year the Laconian women wove a chiton for Apollo and presented it to him, a tradition similar to the peplos offered to Athena at Athens upon the occasion of the Panathenaic Games. Less is known about the third day, indicating that probably mysteries were held. It is described as "merry midnight festival".

So important was this festival that Amyclaeans, even when they had taken the field against an enemy, always returned home on the approach of the season of the Hyacinthia, and the Lacedaemonians on one occasion concluded a truce of forty days with the town of Eira merely to be able to return home and celebrate the national festival. After the treaty with Sparta, B.C. 421, the Athenians, to show their good-will towards Sparta, promised every year to attend the celebration of the Hyacinthia.

Cults and attributes

Hyacinthus had a shrine in Amyclea, which he came to share with Apollo. Various scholars agree that Hyacinthus was a pre-Hellenic nature god, and certain aspects of his own cult suggest that he was a chthonic vegetation deity whose cults were merged with Apollo's. Nilsson says that Hyacinthus is a Cretan word, and its pre-Hellenic origin is indicated by the suffix -nth. Hyacinthus personifies the sprouting vegetation in spring, which is killed by the heat of the summer. The apotheosis of Hyacinthus indicates that, after attaining godhood, he represented the natural cycle of decay and renewal.

The fact that at Tarentum a Hyacinthus tomb is ascribed by Polybius to Apollo Hyacinthus (not Hyacinthus) has led some to think that the personalities are one, and that the hero is merely an emanation from the god; confirmation is sought in the Apolline appellation τετράχειρ, alleged by Hesychius to have been used in Laconia, and assumed to describe a composite figure of Apollo-Hyacinthus. Against this theory is the essential difference between the two figures. Hyacinthus is a chthonian vegetation god whose worshippers are afflicted and sorrowful; though interested in vegetation, Apollo's death is not celebrated in any ritual, his worship is joyous and triumphant, and finally, the Amyclean Apollo is specifically the god of war and song. Moreover, Pausanias describes the monument at Amyclae as consisting of a rude figure of Apollo standing on an altar-shaped base that formed the tomb of Hyacinthus. Into the latter offerings were put for the hero before gifts were made to the god.

Hyacinthus was gifted a swan chariot by Apollo and appeared in ancient arts riding it, either to meet Apollo or to escape the advances of Zephyrus. Swans were believed to be the birds of Hyperborea, a mystical land of eternal spring and immortality, to which Apollo himself traveled every winter on a chariot drawn by swans. This association of Hyacinth with swans places him in close connection to Hyperborean Apollo and spring. It is suggested that Hyacinthus would have spent the winter months in the underworld, or more suitably Hyperborea and returning to earth in the spring when the hyacinth flower blooms.

According to classical interpretations, his myth is a metaphor of the death and rebirth of nature. The festival Hyacinthia included the initiatory rites, that is, the initiation of youths into adulthood.

Attributes 

The flower hyacinth that rose from Hyacinth's blood is said to have had a deep blue or purple hue and a sign resembling the inscription "AI" on its petals, a symbol of sorrow. However, this flower has been identified with another plant, the larkspur, or an iris, or perhaps gladiolus italicus rather than what we today call hyacinth. Other divinely beloved vegetation gods who died in the flower of their youth and were vegetatively transformed include Narcissus, Cyparissus, Mecon and Adonis.

Ancient Greeks associated with Apollo a deep blue or violet precious gem called hyacinth. It was called so because its colour resembled that of the hyacinth flowers. This gem was held sacred to Apollo due to the mythological connection. The people who visited Apollo's shrine, as well as his priests and the high priestess Pythia, were required to wear this gem.

The term 'Hyacinthine hair' refers to the curly hair of Hyacinthus that resembles the curled petals of hyacinth flowers. It is often used poetically. The term could also be descriptive of the colour of the hair; either dark or deep violet. In Homer's Odyssey, Athena gives Odysseus hyacinthine hair to make him look more beautiful. Edgar Allan Poe, in the poem "To Helen", uses the same term to beautify Helen's hair.<ref>M. Eleanor Irwin, Odysseus' "Hyacinthine Hair" in "Odyssey" 6.231</ref>

 See also 

 Apollo
 Branchus
 Cyparissus
 Apollo et Hyacinthus, an opera by Mozart
 Hyacinth, the flower named after Hyacinthus
 Larkspur, the flower suggested is the real hyacinth

 Notes 

 References 
 Apollodorus, The Library with an English Translation by Sir James George Frazer, F.B.A., F.R.S. in 2 Volumes, Cambridge, MA, Harvard University Press; London, William Heinemann Ltd. 1921. . Online version at the Perseus Digital Library. Greek text available from the same website.
 
 Homer, The Iliad with an English Translation by A.T. Murray, PhD in two volumes. Cambridge, MA., Harvard University Press; London, William Heinemann, Ltd. 1924. . Online version at the Perseus Digital Library.
 Homer, Homeri Opera in five volumes. Oxford, Oxford University Press. 1920. . Greek text available at the Perseus Digital Library.
 
 Lucian of Samosata, Dialogues of the Gods translated by Fowler, H W and F G. Oxford: The Clarendon Press. 1905. Online version at theoi.com
 Luciani Samosatensis, Opera. Vol I. Karl Jacobitz. in aedibus B. G. Teubneri. Leipzig. 1896. Greek text available at the Perseus Digital Library.
 Pausanias, Description of Greece with an English Translation by W.H.S. Jones, Litt.D., and H.A. Ormerod, M.A., in 4 Volumes. Cambridge, MA, Harvard University Press; London, William Heinemann Ltd. 1918. . Online version at the Perseus Digital Library
 Pausanias, Graeciae Descriptio. 3 vols. Leipzig, Teubner. 1903.  Greek text available at the Perseus Digital Library.
 Philostratus the Elder. Imagines, translated by Arthur Fairbanks (1864–1944). Loeb Classical Library Volume 256. London: William Heinemann, 1931. Online version at the Topos Text Project.
 Philostratus the Lemnian (Philostratus Major), Flavii Philostrati Opera. Vol 2. Carl Ludwig Kayser. in aedibus B. G. Teubneri. Lipsiae. 1871. Greek text available at the Perseus Digital Library.
 Publius Ovidius Naso, Metamorphoses translated by Brookes More (1859–1942). Boston, Cornhill Publishing Co. 1922. Online version at the Perseus Digital Library.
 Publius Ovidius Naso, Metamorphoses. Hugo Magnus. Gotha (Germany). Friedr. Andr. Perthes. 1892. Latin text available at the Perseus Digital Library.
 Athenaeus, The Learned Banqueters, Volume V: Books 10.420e-11. Edited and translated by S. Douglas Olson. Loeb Classical Library 274. Cambridge, MA: Harvard University Press, 2009.
 Nonnus, Dionysiaca''; translated by Rouse, W H D, II Books XVI-XXXV. Loeb Classical Library No. 345, Cambridge, Massachusetts, Harvard University Press; London, William Heinemann Ltd. 1940. Internet Archive

External links

 HYACINTHUS from The Theoi Project
 

Deeds of Apollo
Demigods in classical mythology
Greek mythological heroes
Laconian mythology
Life-death-rebirth gods
Olympian deities
LGBT themes in Greek mythology
Male lovers of Apollo
Metamorphoses characters
Metamorphoses into flowers in Greek mythology
Nature gods
Princes in Greek mythology
Religion in ancient Sparta